Dolný Štál is a village and municipality in the Dunajská Streda District in the Trnava Region of south-west Slovakia.

Geography
The municipality lies at an altitude of 112 metres and covers an area of 29.997 km². It has a population of 1,962 people.

History
In the 9th century, the territory of Dolný Štál became part of the Kingdom of Hungary. In historical records, the village was first mentioned in 1111. Until the end of World War I, it was part of Hungary and fell within the Dunaszerdahely district of Pozsony County. After the Austro-Hungarian army disintegrated in November 1918, Czechoslovakian troops occupied the area. After the Treaty of Trianon of 1920, it became officially part of Czechoslovakia and fell within Bratislava County until 1927. In November 1938, the First Vienna Award granted the area to Hungary and it was held by Hungary until 1945. After Soviet occupation in 1945, the Czechoslovakian administration returned, and the village became officially part of Czechoslovakia in 1947.

Demography 
In 1910, the village had 1040, in 1991 the census indicated 1889, while the 2001 census 1962 inhabitants. The village has an absolute Hungarian majority.

See also
 List of municipalities and towns in Slovakia

References

Genealogical resources

The records for genealogical research are available at the state archive "Statny Archiv in Bratislava, Slovakia"
 Roman Catholic church records (births/marriages/deaths): 1713-1905 (parish A)
 Lutheran church records (births/marriages/deaths): 1823-1946 (parish B)
 Reformated church records (births/marriages/deaths): 1783-1902 (parish A)

External links
Alistál in the news 
Surnames of living people in Dolny Stal

Villages and municipalities in Dunajská Streda District
Hungarian communities in Slovakia